Loida Garcia-Febo is a Puerto Rican American librarian and library consultant.  Garcia-Febo served on the Governing Board of the International Federation of Library Associations (IFLA) 2013-2015 and 2015-2017 and she was a member of the Executive Board of the American Library Association 2015-2020 serving as a board member and president. She was president of the National Association to Promote Library and Information Services to Latinos and the Spanish Speaking (REFORMA) from 2009-2010.

Career
Garcia-Febo has served as an elementary school librarian in Puerto Rico, Graduated from the Graduate School of Information Science and Technology (EGCTI), University of Puerto Rico. Was a librarian at the Centro de Informacion (PRATP) of the Unidad de Servicios Bibliotecarios para Personas con Impedimentos (SBPI) de la Universidad de Puerto Rico, [University of Puerto Rico, Library Services for Persons with Disabilities’ Assistive Technology Information Center], Chief of the SBPI, and Manager at Queens Library.

Garcia-Febo was a co-founder of the IFLA New Professionals SIG (Special Interest Group), an international forum for library and information services students and newly qualified librarians.

Garcia-Febo has served on the Access to Learning Award Advisory Board for the Bill & Melinda Gates Foundation - Global Libraries, the Library 2.0 Advisory Board from the San Jose State University School of Information, Library Advisory Board of Praeger an imprint of ABC-Clio, and the Public Libraries Advisory Committee and has been associated with REFORMA (The National Association to Promote Library and Information Services to Latinos and the Spanish-Speaking) serving on the board from 2008–11, including a term as president from 2009-10.

Garcia-Febo represented the International Federation of Library Associations and Institutions as a speaker at the United Nations Development Programme Meeting on Data Accountability for the Post-2015 Development Agenda in New York.

Garcia-Febo was the President of Information New Wave, an international charity seeking to enhance the education of minority groups in the USA and in developing countries.

In April 2017, Garcia-Febo was elected president-elect of the American Library Association 2018–2019. Garcia-Febo completed a national tour of libraries during her presidential term leading the Libraries = Strong Communities national advocacy initiative. Garcia-Febo represented the American Library Association at Generation Code: Born in the Library interactive exhibition presenting to the members of the European Parliament.

In June 2020, Garcia-Febo was elected to the Board of Trustees for the Freedom to Read Foundation. She also chairs the American Library Association Task Force on United Nations 2030 Sustainable Development Goals.

Works
 Garcia-Febo, L. 2016. Working together: access to information and our power to cause change. Paper presented at: IFLA WLIC 2016 – Columbus, OH.
 Garcia-Febo, L. 2015. “La privacidad y la proteccion de datos.” In Analysis sobre tendencias de informacion propuestas por la IFLA. Mexico: UNAM, 2015.
 Garcia-Febo, L. 2013. Fundamental Freedoms, Library Services and Multi-Lingual Populations. Special Issue of Indiana Libraries: Intellectual Freedom & Censorship 32 (1): 45-46.
 Garcia-Febo, L. and R. Kear. 2012. “Worldwide Perceptions of New Librarians.” In Wolf-Fritz Riekert and Ingeborg Simon (Eds.), Information in e-motion Proceedings BOBCATSSS 2012 – 20th International Conference on Information Science. Amsterdam, 23–25 January 2012. Bad Honnef, Germany: Bock+Herchen Verlag, p. 122-125.
 Martínez Arellano, F. F. and L. Garcia-Febo. (eds.). 2011. Servicios bibliotecarios en America Latina: tres casos prominentes = Library services in Latin American: three outstanding cases. México UNAM, Centro Universitario de Investigaciones Bibliotecológicas : Federación Internacional de Asociaciones e Instituciones Bibliotecarias para America Latina y el Caribe.
 Garcia-Febo, L. 2011. “ALA, IFLA and their relationship with Latin America.” In John Ayala and Sal Guerena (Eds.), Pathways to Progress: Issues and Advances in Latino Librarianship. California: Libraries Unlimited.

Awards
 2015 REFORMA Elizabeth Martinez Lifetime Achievement Award
 Notable Member on ALA’s International Relations Round Table
 2010 Elizabeth Futas Catalyst for Change Award 
 2007 Library Journal Mover & Shaker Freedom Fighter
 2004 ALA/IFLA Fellowship for the 2004 IFLA Congress where she co-founded the IFLA New Professionals

References

External links
 Professional website

 
 

American librarians
American women librarians
Living people
Year of birth missing (living people)
Hispanic and Latino American librarians
Puerto Rican educators
University of Puerto Rico alumni